Myrabolia is the only genus in the beetle family Myraboliidae in the superfamily Cucujoidea. It has about 13 species, found in Australia. Adults and possibly larvae live under the bark of Eucalyptus trees.

Species
These species are members of the genus Myrabolia.
 Myrabolia micra Tomaszewska & Slipinski, 2008
 Myrabolia elongata Tomaszewska & Slipinski, 2008
 Myrabolia brevicornis (Erichson 1842)
 Myrabolia grouvelliana Reitter 1878
 Myrabolia kioloa Tomaszewska & Slipinski, 2008
 Myrabolia pelion Tomaszewska & Slipinski, 2008
 Myrabolia lawrencei Tomaszewska & Slipinski, 2008
 Myrabolia australis Tomaszewska & Slipinski, 2008
 Myrabolia longicornis Blackburn 1903
 Myrabolia blackburni Tomaszewska & Slipinski, 2008
 Myrabolia lindensis Blackburn 1892
 Myrabolia leai (Grouvelle, 1911)
 Myrabolia tasmanica Tomaszewska & Slipinski, 2008

References

Cucujoidea genera